Diesel Vanilla is the third  studio album by Ezio, released in 1997.

Track listing

"Deeper" – 4:14
"Moon" – 4:22
"Accordion Girl" – 4:50
"Cinderella" – 4:20
"One more walk round the dancefloor" – 4:56
"Maybe sometimes" – 4:18
"Alex" – 4:25
"Call you tomorrow" – 3:59
"All the dreams" – 4:38
"Back on your own again" – 4:06

Personnel 

Mark "Booga" Fowell – guitar
Ezio Lunedei – guitar

See also
1997 in music

1997 albums
Ezio (band) albums
Arista Records albums